The Thunder Bay City Council is the governing body of the city of Thunder Bay, Ontario, Canada. It consists of a mayor and twelve councillors. The mayor and five of the councillors are elected at large, with one councillor being elected for each of the city's seven wards: Current River, McIntyre, McKellar, Neebing, Northwood, Red River, and Westfort. Council members are elected to four year terms. The last election was held on October 24, 2022

Thunder Bay City Council meets at 6:30 PM on Monday evenings at Thunder Bay City Hall, located at 500 Donald Street East in the downtown core of the former city of Fort William.

Thunder Bay City Council, 2022 - 2026
Council elected in the 2022 municipal election:
 Ken Boshcoff, Mayor
 Shelby Ch'ng, At large
 Mark Bentz, at large
 Trevor Giertuga, at large
 Rajni Agarwal, at large
 Kasey (Taylor) Etreni, At large
 Albert Aiello, McIntyre Ward
 Andrew Foulds, Current River Ward
 Greg Johnson, Neebing Ward
 Brian Hamtilon, McKellar Ward
 Dominic Pasqualino, Northwood Ward
 Michael Zussino, Red River Ward
 Kristen Oliver, Westfort Ward

Thunder Bay City Council, 2018 - 2022
Council elected in the 2018 municipal election:
 Bill Mauro, Mayor
 Peng You, At large
 Mark Bentz, at large
 Trevor Giertuga, at large
 Rebecca Johnson, at large
 Aldo Ruberto, At large
 Albert Aiello, McIntyre Ward
 Andrew Foulds, Current River Ward
 Cody Fraser, Neebing Ward
 Brian Hamtilon, McKellar Ward
 Shelby Ch'ng, Northwood Ward
 Brian McKinnon, Red River Ward
 Kristen Oliver, Westfort Ward

Thunder Bay City Council, 2014 - 2018
Council elected in the 2014 municipal election:
Keith Hobbs, mayor
Iain Angus, councillor at large
Larry Hebert, councillor at large
Rebecca Johnson, councillor at large
Aldo Ruberto, councillor at large
Frank Pullia, councillor at large
Andrew Foulds, Current River Ward
Trevor Giertuga, McIntyre Ward
Paul Pugh, McKellar Ward
Linda Rydholm, Neebing Ward
Shelby Ch'ng, Northwood Ward
Brian McKinnon, Red River Ward
Joe Virdiramo, Westfort Ward

Thunder Bay City Council, 2010 - 2014
Council elected in the 2010 municipal election:
Keith Hobbs, mayor
Iain Angus, councillor at large
Ken Boshcoff, councillor at large
Larry Hebert, councillor at large
Rebecca Johnson, councillor at large
Aldo Ruberto, councillor at large
Andrew Foulds, Current River Ward
Trevor Giertuga, McIntyre Ward
Paul Pugh, McKellar Ward
Linda Rydholm, Neebing Ward
Mark Bentz, Northwood Ward
Brian McKinnon, Red River Ward
Joe Virdiramo, Westfort Ward

Thunder Bay City Council, 2006 - 2010
Council elected in the 2006 municipal election:
 Lynn Peterson, mayor
 Iain Angus, councillor at large
 Larry Hebert, councillor at large
 Rebecca Johnson, councillor at large
 Frank Pullia, councillor at large
 Aldo Ruberto, councillor at large
 Mark Bentz, Northwood ward
 Andrew Foulds, Current River ward
 Trevor Giertuga, McIntyre ward
 Brian McKinnon, Red River ward
 Linda Rydholm, Neebing ward
 Robert Tuchenhagen, McKellar ward
 Joe Virdiramo, Westfort ward

References

External links
A detailed map of Thunder Bay's seven wards 167KB.
Thunder Bay City Council - Contact Page

Municipal councils in Ontario
Municipal government of Thunder Bay